E. Scott Blair (born December 15, 1929) is an American politician who served as a member of the King County Council from 1980 to 1984. A member of the Republican Party, he represented the 2nd district.

References 

Living people
King County Councillors
Republican Party members of the Washington House of Representatives
1929 births